Triplophysa ferganaensis, known as the Fergana stone loach, is a species of ray-finned fish in the family Nemacheilidae. It is endemic to the Shohimardonsoy stream in Fergana Valley, Uzbekistan. It lives in fast-flowing rivers over 1500m in altitude.

Etymology 
The specific name ferganaensis is taken from the Fergana Valley, Uzbekistan, where the type locality is located (Shakhimardan stream in Yordon village).

Description 
It grows to 109.2 mm (4.3 in) SL. Eyes are present. Mouth is inferior. Gill rakers are absent in outer row, however, 10–11 gill rakers are found in inner row on first-gill arch. Scales are absent on the body. The lateral line is complete. Elongated body is slightly compressed anteriorly and strongly compressed posteriorly. Lips thick with furrows and papillae. Three pairs of barbels are present. Dorsal and anal fins are truncate. Pectoral fins are moderately developed. Caudal fin emarginated and tips are pointed.

References 

ferganaensis
Freshwater fish of Asia
Fish of Central Asia
Fish described in 2021